Mullapudi or Mullapoodi is an Indian surname using by Telugus, especially seen among Kammas. People with this name include:

 Mullapudi Harishchandra Prasad is one of the pioneering and prominent industrialists in Southern India
 Mullapudi Venkata Ramana is a Telugu story writer
 Mullapudi Ravichandranath Chowdary is a Telugu historian

Indian surnames